Husie IF is a Swedish football club located in Husie which is a residential area of Malmö. The club has several youth teams, a men's team and a women's team. The club is affiliated to Skånes Fotbollförbund.

Season to season

Footnotes

External links
 

Football clubs in Malmö
Football clubs in Skåne County